Kyamin  is a village development committee in Tanahu District in the Gandaki Zone of central Nepal. At the time of the 1991 Nepal census it had a population of 5483 people living in 1087 individual households.

References

External links
UN map of the municipalities of Tanahu District

Populated places in Tanahun District